Tyler Cowen (born January 21, 1962) is an American economist, columnist and blogger. He is a professor at George Mason University, where he holds the Holbert L. Harris chair in the economics department. He hosts the economics blog Marginal Revolution, together with co-author Alex Tabarrok. Cowen and Tabarrok also maintain the website Marginal Revolution University, a venture in online education.

Cowen writes the "Economic Scene" column for The New York Times and since July 2016 has been a regular opinion columnist at Bloomberg Opinion. He also writes for such publications as The New Republic, The Wall Street Journal, Forbes, Newsweek and the Wilson Quarterly. He serves as general director of George Mason's Mercatus Center, a university research center that focuses on the market economy. Since 2015, he has hosted the podcast Conversations with Tyler. In September, 2018, Tyler and his team at George Mason University launched Emergent Ventures, a grant and fellowship focused on "moon-shot" ideas.

He was ranked at number 72 among the "Top 100 Global Thinkers" in 2011 by Foreign Policy Magazine "for finding markets in everything". In a 2011 poll of experts by The Economist, Cowen was included in the top 36 nominations of "which economists were most influential over the past decade".

Education and personal life 
Cowen was raised in Hillsdale, New Jersey and attended Pascack Valley High School. At 15, he became the youngest ever New Jersey state chess champion. Cowen is of Irish ancestry.

He graduated from George Mason University with a Bachelor of Science degree in economics in 1983 and received his PhD in economics from Harvard University in 1987 with his thesis titled Essays in the theory of welfare economics. At Harvard, he was mentored by game theorist Thomas Schelling, the 2005 recipient of the Nobel Memorial Prize in Economics. He is married to Natasha Cowen, a lawyer.

Writings

Culture 
The Los Angeles Times has described Cowen as "a man who can talk about Haitian voodoo flags, Iranian cinema, Hong Kong cuisine, Abstract Expressionism, Zairian music and Mexican folk art with seemingly equal facility". One of Cowen's primary research interests is the economics of culture. He has written books on fame (What Price Fame?), art (In Praise of Commercial Culture) and cultural trade (Creative Destruction: How Globalization Is Changing the World's Cultures). In Markets and Cultural Voices, he relays how globalization is changing the world of three Mexican amate painters. Cowen argues that free markets change culture for the better, allowing them to evolve into something more people want. Other books include Public Goods and Market Failures, The Theory of Market Failure, Explorations in the New Monetary Economics, Risk and Business Cycles, Economic Welfare and New Theories of Market Failure. 

In 2023, Cowen falsely claimed on his blog that Francis Bacon was a critic of the printing press, including fictional quotations and references he had gotten from ChatGPT.

Books 

 Talent: How to Identify Energizers, Creatives, and Winners Around the World, with Daniel Gross. New York: St. Martin's Press, 2022, .
 Big Business: A Love Letter to an American Anti-Hero. New York: St. Martin's Press, 2019. , .
 
 .
  (Wikipedia page)
 With Alex Tabarrok: 
 
 
 The Age of the Infovore: Succeeding in the Information Economy (2010)
 
 
 
 
 
 
 
 
 Explorations in the New Monetary Economics (1994)

The New York Times columns 
Cowen's New York Times columns cover a wide range of issues such as the 2008 financial crisis.

Dining guide 
His dining guide for the D.C. area, "Tyler Cowen's Ethnic Dining Guide", has been written about by The Washington Post and Washington City Paper.

Political philosophy 
Cowen has written papers on political philosophy and ethics. He co-wrote a paper with philosopher Derek Parfit arguing against the social discount rate. In a 2006 paper, he argued that the epistemic problem fails to refute consequentialism.

Cowen has been described as a "libertarian bargainer" who can influence practical policy making, yet he endorsed bank bailouts in his March 2, 2009 column in The New York Times. In a 2007 article entitled "The Paradox of Libertarianism", Cowen argued that libertarians "should embrace a world with growing wealth, growing positive liberty, and yes, growing government. We don't have to favor the growth in government per se, but we do need to recognize that sometimes it is a package deal".

In 2012, David Brooks called Cowen "one of the most influential bloggers on the right", writing that he is among those who "start from broadly libertarian premises but do not apply them in a doctrinaire way".

In an August, 2014 blog post, Cowen wrote: "Just to summarize, I generally favor much more immigration but not open borders, I am a liberal on most but not all social issues, and I am market-oriented on economic issues. On most current foreign policy issues I am genuinely agnostic as to what exactly we should do but skeptical that we are doing the right thing at the moment. I don't like voting for either party or for third parties".

In a 2020 New Year's Day Marginal Revolution post, Cowen outlined a philosophical framework he dubbed "State Capacity Libertarianism". State Capacity Libertarianism differs from classical liberalism in that it acknowledges the State's role in funding and executing megaprojects and a non-isolationist foreign policy.

Cowen has described himself as a liberal on most social issues and supports same-sex marriage. After the Supreme Court issued its holding regarding same-sex marriage, Cowen said that "this is exciting and very positive news. Most of all, it is a breakthrough for those people who can now marry, or exercise the choice not to marry".

Cowen is a teetotaler, stating he is "with the Mormons" on alcohol, later stating: "I encourage people to just completely, voluntarily abstain from alcohol and make it a social norm".

In July 2019, Cowen co-authored an essay in The Atlantic with Stripe co-founder Patrick Collison calling for a "new science of progress".

Conversations with Tyler 
Conversations with Tyler is Cowen's podcast produced by the Mercatus Center at George Mason. Unlike Marginal Revolution, Conversations is hosted by Cowen exclusively. Guests are usually authors and academics, but have also included athletes (Martina Navratilova, Kareem Abdul-Jabbar), military personnel (Stanley A. McChrystal), entrepreneurs (Mark Zuckerberg, Brian Armstrong), novelists (Emily St. John Mandel) and a homeless person from Washington, D.C. named "Alexander the Grate".  

The show has two recurring segments:  
 "Underrated/Overrated", where guests are given a quick-fire list of cultural works or academic concepts and asked to say whether they agree with the general critical response received.
 The [guest name] Production Function, where guests are asked to describe their personal productivity habits.          

In describing the podcast, Cowen repeatedly characterises it as "...the conversation I want to have".

Publications

Selected journal articles

Select articles 
 
 
 
 
 
 
 "The Lack of Wars May Be Hurting Economic Growth"- NYTimes, June 14, 2014

References

External links 

 Cowen's bio at the Mercatus Center
 Tyler Cowen's Web Page at GMU
 Marginal Revolution
 
 Conversations with Tyler
 China Is Big Trouble for the U.S. Balance of Trade, Right? Well, Not So Fast
 
 What's wrong with cute-o-nomics?
 Review of Naomi Klein's The Shock Doctrine: The Rise of Disaster Capitalism
 New York Books Review of Discover Your Inner Economist
 
 

1962 births
Living people
20th-century American non-fiction writers
20th-century American economists
21st-century American non-fiction writers
21st-century American economists
American male bloggers
American bloggers
American food writers
American libertarians
American people of Irish descent
American political writers
American social sciences writers
Cato Institute people
George Mason University alumni
George Mason University faculty
Harvard Graduate School of Arts and Sciences alumni
Libertarian economists
The New York Times columnists
Pascack Valley High School alumni
People from Hillsdale, New Jersey
Mercatus Center
Economists from New Jersey
American podcasters